This article lists most power stations that run on tidal power. Since tidal stream generators are an immature technology, no technology has yet emerged as the clear standard. A large variety of designs are being experimented with, with some very close to large scale deployment. Hence, the following page lists stations of different technologies.

Tidal power stations

Operational 
The following table lists tidal power stations that are in operation:

Under construction 
The following table lists tidal power stations that are currently under construction as of the date in each cited source.

Proposed 
There are many stations in proposal at the moment. The following table lists tidal power stations that are only at a proposal stage.

Decommissioned

See also 

 List of largest power stations in the world
 List of hydroelectric power station failures

References 

Tide
 
Tidal